Sheikh Hassan Haroon (died 6 May 2021) was an Indian politician from the state of Goa. He was a five term member of the Goa Legislative Assembly representing the Mormugao constituency.

Political career
Haroon was the Industry minister of Goa from 1999 to 2002 and Speaker of the Goa Legislative Assembly from 1991 to 1995. He was also the Law and Revenue Minister of Goa from 1984 to 1989.

Mormugao Assembly Constituency
Haroon was a five term member of the Goa Legislative Assembly representing the Mormugao constituency, four terms from 1977 to 1994 and 1999 to 2002.

Indian National Congress (Sheik Hassan)
After leaving the Indian National Congress Haroon floated his own political party called  Indian National Congress (Sheik Hassan) in 2002. Later this party merged with Bharatiya Janata Party.

References 

Members of the Goa Legislative Assembly
2021 deaths
People from South Goa district
Speakers of the Goa Legislative Assembly
Bharatiya Janata Party politicians from Goa
Indian National Congress politicians from Goa
Year of birth missing
Indian National Congress (U) politicians
Indian Muslims